Linn Street is an abandoned and never used subway station of the Cincinnati Subway. The station was planned in 1916, but lacked funding to complete.

References

Transportation buildings and structures in Cincinnati
Former railway stations in Ohio